is a Japanese actor, voice actor and narrator.

Biography
Aoyama became interested on films, while attending elementary school. He did not have the film study group in high school. He joined Bearer's group with a yearning. It has forty female members in the theater club and Aoyama is the only male member. Interpreting was the most fun, but he was aware of the feeling of alienation that there was only one man. He wanted to learn all about theatre in college, including basic theories.

Aoyama spent time immersed in the theater, studying in London and living for two to three years. Most of the acting training was a private tour with private classes, but he saw the United Kingdom and thought that pattern was too ideal, a work that he can do, a work that adapts to the Japanese, it was a retired mentality that he could not imagine how it was. When working part-time at Kabukiza, a person recommended that "Aoyama is suitable for voice actors because of its voice characteristics," and entered visual techno academia. After graduation, he was selected as the leading role in a certain series.

Filmography

Anime

Film

Video games

Drama CD

Tokusatsu

Other dubbing

References

External links
Official agency profile 

1965 births
Living people
Japanese male video game actors
Japanese male voice actors
Male voice actors from Aichi Prefecture
Nihon University alumni
21st-century Japanese male actors